The Marco Polo sheep (Ovis ammon polii) is a subspecies of argali sheep, named after Marco Polo. Their habitat are the mountainous regions of Central Asia. Marco Polo sheep are distinguishable mostly by their large size and spiraling horns. Their conservation status is "near threatened" and efforts have been made to protect their numbers and keep them from being hunted. It has also been suggested that crossing them with domestic sheep could have agricultural benefits.

Naming
The binomial name of the species as a whole is Ovis ammon, described by Swedish naturalist Carl Linnaeus in 1758, and all members of the species are commonly called "argali". The Marco Polo subspecies Ovis ammon polii was first described scientifically by zoologist Edward Blyth in 1841.  These sheep are also commonly called "Marco Polo's Argali" or the "Pamir Argali.".

The sheep are named after the 13th century explorer Marco Polo because they were described in The Travels of Marco Polo.  The 1914 Historical and Political Gazetteer of Afghanistan: Badakhshan notes that in Badakhshan Province, Afghanistan the sheep are known locally as nakhjipar. They are called "ra-ma-poy" in Wakhi, the language of natives of the Khunzerav region round the high Khunjerab Pass between Pakistan and China.

Characteristics

O. a. polii's horns follow a coil pattern, with the tips pointed directly away horizontally from the head; in spite of this, the tips are rarely broken. The horns have long been a popular attraction for trophy hunters. They begin growing 15–20 days after the sheep are born, and their growth in length is most pronounced during the first year. Thickness growth is most noticeable during the first two years.

Ovis ammon sheep are colored a dark brown, with white underparts; the two different sections are separated by a dark band of hair. There is a white patch on the rump as well, which is not so clearly defined on most subspecies except O. a. polii. As winter approaches, the white hair on males grows longer, until it becomes a prominent ruff, although on O. a. polii the ruff stands out less than other subspecies. Females' coats are lighter than the males', and do not have such a drastic seasonal change. The Marco Polo sheep's face is lighter colored than the body.

Mature rams on average weigh . The sheep rut in December. Gestation lasts about 160 days, with single births being normal and twins uncommon. A captive ewe once gave birth to five lambs at once, then triplets two years later.

Marco Polo sheep have an average life span of 13 years. The horns develop rings each year by which the age of male animals may be determined. Since females do not have horns, it is harder to determine their age.

No data have been compiled showing the susceptibility of the sheep to disease, although tests have been run on similar species of sheep and the data may be similar. Since Marco Polo sheep are reluctant to approach people, it is not likely that they can catch diseases common to domestic flocks, although some domestic sheep are allowed to run wild over the mountains, and it is unknown if they come into contact with Marco Polo sheep. However, the shepherds in the area do not generally have access to veterinary care for their animals, and it is possible that these could transmit diseases to the wild sheep.

Habitat
Most Marco Polo sheep live in the Pamir Mountains region adjacent to the borders of Afghanistan, Pakistan, Kyrgyzstan, Tajikistan and China. The subspecies lives mainly in the northwestern part of the Hunza district of Pakistan along the Chinese border, inhabiting the Kilik Mintaka border and the northwestern area of Khunjerab National Park. Marco Polo sheep also inhabit the Wakhan Corridor, along the Afghanistan border. They share much of their habitat with animals such as the Siberian ibex. During summer, Marco Polo sheep prefer to be near riparian areas and vegetation, while during winter they prefer to be in gentler and south-facing mountain slopes. Terrain ruggedness and annual mean temperature are the two major factors that affect their distribution.

Behavior
Marco Polo sheep are similar in behavior to other members of the genus Ovis. They generally live in small flocks of a few dozen. During the summer, they break into smaller flocks of the same sex. During and after the rut, however, they group together to form larger groups for protection, and to conserve energy.

When the rut begins, rams begin to fight for dominance among their flocks; dominant rams then choose their ewes without competition from the losers. Only mature rams (those over 6 years old) fight for dominance. The young will sometimes threaten older males, but never charge them. The mature rams fight by standing next to each other and spinning around, then one steps back and charges. O. a. polii males have been noted to rise up on their hind legs when they clash with opponents, which is not common in lowland sheep and similar to the fighting habits of goats. The males commonly emit grunts while fighting and often chip their horns or break their noses.

After dominance has been established, the rams begin to select their ewes. Although Marco Polo sheep rams are known to herd females, during the rut males pair off with females to reproduce. Males will approach a flock of females and smell the urine of possible mates. When smelling the ewe's urine, the males display the Flehmen response to test if the ewe is in estrus. Shackleton calls this phenomenon "lip-curl" and describes it as "raising the head with the mouth open and upper lip curled back." The ram then splits from the flock to copulate with his ewe and afterward will often stay with the flock for a month or two.

Conservation

Hunting
Hunting the Marco Polo sheep first became popular when Mohammed Zahir Shah, king of Afghanistan, hunted and killed a ram in the 1950s. He thereafter declared that the valley in which he hunted be a protected habitat for the sheep as a hunting grounds for Afghan royalty, and it was not until 1968 that an American tourist was allowed to hunt in the reserve. In 2008, it was estimated that American hunters paid an average of $20,000 to $25,000 for an expedition to hunt a Marco Polo sheep. A recent study put the cost at $40,000 per permit.

In 1976, in Khunzerav, the sheep's population was estimated to be 300. This number declined to a maximum of 160 between 1978 and 1981, and declined again to only 45 in 1991. George Schaller of the Wildlife Conservation Society estimated the worldwide population in 2003 as around 10,000, half what Ronald Petocz estimated in his 1973 tour. Their population density has been recorded as fewer than two animals per . The Marco Polo sheep was included on the first list of protected species issued by the Afghanistan National Environmental Protection Agency in June 2009.

Khunjerab National Park
The Khunjerab National Park was established primarily as a means to protect the Marco Polo sheep (as well as snow leopards and bharal) living in the area. The borders of the park were mapped by Schaller in 1974, after a short field survey. The park was formally established on April 29, 1975 by Prime Minister of Pakistan Zulfikar Ali Bhutto, who said that "it must become a world famous park". Despite being listed as a category 2 national park, banning human activities including agriculture and hunting, the park was poorly managed, meaning that illegal hunting of the Marco Polo sheep continued. Because of this, the International Union for Conservation of Nature commissioned Norwegian biologist Per Wegge to do a wildlife survey of the park in 1988. Wegge found that there was no evidence of competition between the domestic sheep being illegally grazed and the wild Marco Polo sheep, and that most of the illegal hunting was not being done by local Wakhi residents, but by Pakistani military and civil officials. He therefore proposed that the park be reclassified, allowing grazing and commercial hunting, with the profits going to local residents. However, the government overlooked Wegge's suggestions, instead drawing up a new management plan, which both the IUCN and the World Wildlife Fund supported as a means to preserve the park and protect the wildlife. Wegge was critical of the government scheme, claiming that it was based on financial considerations, with the Pakistani government hoping to attract tourists to the area. The IUCN agreed with this, and has since distanced itself from the national park. To help protect the animals from poaching, the WWF has created the Khunjerab Village Organization, which relies on people living in the area to report poaching or endangered animal sightings.

Pamir Peace Park
In 2008, George Schaller launched a campaign to protect the Marco Polo sheep. After the Khunjerab National Park was established by Pakistan in 1975; and the Taxkorgan Nature Reserve similarly settled in China in 1984, Schaller noted that the parks were insufficient to protect the sheep, due to their seasonal migrations. Schaller, among others, then proposed an international reserve in 1987 to combat the problem, but the effort was stalled due to political difficulties. "It's never easy to get the governments of four countries to agree on anything," Schaller has said of his efforts. His mission was to found a park straddling the borders of China, Pakistan, Afghanistan and Tajikistan in which the sheep would be protected. Schaller called the proposed reserve the "Pamir International Peace Park."

Agriculture
According to Marco Polo's original description of the sheep, the horns (which he described as "as much as six palms in length") were used by shepherds to craft large bowls, or to build pens for the flocks. This sheep may be crossed with domestic sheep to provide larger cuts of leaner meat. Additionally, as the meat of Marco Polo sheep is said to lack the muttony flavor of domestic sheep meat, researchers for the United States National Research Council Advisory Committee on Technology Innovation concluded that the meat of a cross may prove popular with consumers. However, Marco Polo sheep could be bred for more than just meat: their horns could be valuable, as could their hides or their wool.

Notes

References

Sources

External links

Video of Marco Polo sheep from ARKive

Ovis
Mammals of Central Asia
Mammals of Afghanistan
Mammals of China
Mammals of Pakistan
Marco Polo
Taxa named by Edward Blyth